Alan James Coleman (28 December 1936 – 10 December 2013) was an English-born TV series writer, director and producer, primarily in the southern hemisphere, where he worked on soap operas The Young Doctors (which he also created), The Restless Years, Punishment, Breakers, Neighbours and Shortland Street.

Earlier he was the head of children's programming at ATV in the UK until emigrating to Australia in 1974. In 1997, he directed several episodes of the British soap opera, Family Affairs as a part of a working holiday in the UK. At one point, he also temporarily parted company with the Reg Grundy production stable to establish his own company, which provided television coverage of major sporting events. Before going behind the camera, he originally worked as an actor and is on record as saying that "you cannot be a good director unless you have acted yourself".

Coleman's autobiography, One Door Shuts'', was self-published through Trafford Publishing in 2009.

Personal life
Coleman was married to Barbara (deceased). He had three children; Nick, Chris (deceased) and Jacqui.

Coleman died on 10 December 2013 on the Central Coast in New South Wales. His agent, Darren Gray, stated "Alan was a very special man. He launched so many careers both in front of and behind the camera, was behind so many hit shows and gave pleasure through his work to audiences around the world. He pioneered the art form viewers refer to as the soap opera but to him the shows were always five nights a week, fast turn-around drama serials."

Honour
In 2008, Coleman was presented with the inaugural "Lifetime Achievement Award" for his outstanding contribution to the 'soap opera' industry at The Soap Shows- Aussie Soap Awards.

References

External links

1936 births
2013 deaths
Australian soap opera writers
English screenwriters
English male screenwriters
English soap opera writers
British male television writers
Australian male television writers